Fargo is a city in Clinch County, Georgia, United States.  As of the 2020 census, the city had a population of 250. Formerly a town, it was incorporated by the Georgia state legislature in 1992, effective on April 1 of that year.  

Fargo is located near the Okefenokee Swamp and is the western gateway to the Okefenokee National Wildlife Refuge. Also nearby is Stephen C. Foster State Park.

The city was threatened in April and May 2007 by the Bugaboo Scrub Fire, the largest wildfire in Georgia's history.

Geography

Fargo is located in southern Clinch County at  (30.686698, −82.567076). Its western border is formed by Suwannoochee Creek, which is also the Echols County line. The Suwannee River forms the eastern border of the city.

U.S. Route 441 passes through the eastern side of the city, leading north  to Homerville, Georgia, and south  to Lake City, Florida. Georgia State Route 177 leads northeast  to its end in the Okefenokee Swamp at Stephen C. Foster State Park.

Demographics

2020 census

As of the 2020 United States census, there were 250 people, 89 households, and 59 families residing in the city.

2000 census
As of the census of 2000, there were 380 people, 146 households, and 105 families residing in the city. The racial makeup of the city was 79.47% White, 18.95% African American, 1.32% Native American, and 0.26% from two or more races. Hispanic or Latino of any race were 0.53% of the population.

There were 146 households, out of which 30.1% had children under the age of 18 living with them, 56.2% were married couples living together, 11.6% had a female householder with no husband present, and 27.4% were non-families. 26.0% of all households were made up of individuals, and 9.6% had someone living alone who was 65 years of age or older.  The average household size was 2.60 and the average family size was 3.16.

In the city, the population was spread out, with 26.8% under the age of 18, 7.6% from 18 to 24, 30.8% from 25 to 44, 23.2% from 45 to 64, and 11.6% who were 65 years of age or older.  The median age was 34 years. For every 100 females, there were 104.3 males.  For every 100 females age 18 and over, there were 93.1 males.

The median income for a household in the city was $32,500, and the median income for a family was $34,500. Males had a median income of $30,179 versus $17,019 for females. The per capita income for the city was $12,380.  About 12.3% of families and 12.8% of the population were below the poverty line, including 14.0% of those under age 18 and 25.9% of those age 65 or over.

References

Cities in Georgia (U.S. state)
Cities in Clinch County, Georgia